Kristin E. Kassner (born November 22, 1978) is a current member of the Massachusetts House of Representatives for the 2nd Essex District. In 2022 Kassner challenged incumbent Rep. Lenny Mirra. After the initial counting of votes, Kassner lost the election by 10 votes. However, following a hand recount, totals shifted to reflect a one-vote victory for Kassner. Following litigation, appeals, and a review by a special committee of the House of Representatives, Rep. Kassner was sworn in by Governor Maura Healey on Friday, February 3, 2023.

Election and recount 
After the November 8, 2022 election, incumbent Lenny Mirra was declared the winner of the 2nd Essex District by 10 votes. Kassner petitioned and filed for a hand recount in all six communities in the 2nd Essex District. After the recount, it was determined that Kassner received one more vote than Mirra. 

Mirra contested the recount, noting that count irregularities and human error led to an erroneous election tally. Mirra noted that vote counts from the recount did not match the count of votes from the election itself. Georgetown had one fewer vote after the recount, Rowley had three additional votes after the recount, Ipswich had 14 additional votes after the recount, and Newbury had three fewer votes after the recount. Mirra also contested several ballot on the basis that the intent of the voter was not properly ascertained. For example, one ballot with a scribble mark in the oval next to Mirra’s name slightly touched the bubble next to Kassner’s name; the ballot was determined to be an “overvote” and was counted as blank. 

After a review of Mirra’s lawsuit, the Essex County Superior Court decided that the jurisdiction of the matter rested with the House of Representatives itself.  A special committee investigated Mirra’s claims, but ultimately did not summon outside witnesses or examine the ballots preserved for litigation. In a 2-1 committee vote, the panel recommended that the House seat Rep. Kassner. She was sworn in on February 3rd, 2023.

References 

Living people
Democratic Party members of the Massachusetts House of Representatives
21st-century American politicians
Women state legislators in Massachusetts
21st-century American women politicians
1978 births